Mesoglicola is a monotypic genus of crustaceans belonging to the monotypic family Mesoglicolidae. The only species is Mesoglicola delagei.

The species is found in Western Europe.

References

Cyclopoida
Copepod genera
Monotypic crustacean genera